The 2008 season was the seventeenth full year of competitive football in the Baltic country as an independent nation. The Estonia national football team played a total number of fifteen matches (including one unofficial) in 2008 and started in the qualifying tournament for the 2010 FIFA World Cup in South Africa.

Poland vs Estonia

Estonia vs Canada

Estonia vs Georgia

Latvia vs Estonia

Estonia vs Lithuania

Estonia vs Faroe Islands

Estonia vs Malta

Belgium vs Estonia

Bosnia Herzegovina vs Estonia

Estonia vs Spain

Estonia vs Turkey

Estonia vs Latvia

Estonia vs Moldova

Estonia vs Lithuania

Murcia vs Estonia

Notes

References
 RSSSF detailed results
 Estonian Football Federation

2008
2008 national football team results
National